Play Sports (formerly Prime Sport (2005-2012) and Sporting Telenet (2012-2015) is a brand of the Flemish cable distributor Telenet, which consists of a bundle of different (partly own) channels. Through television stations, competitions from various European football competitions, including The Belgian Jupiler Pro League. In addition, Play Sports includes American NBA Basketball, American Football and Golf. In March 2014, it also acquired rights to broadcast Formula 1 until 2019. In July 2015, the name changed From Sporting Telenet to Play Sports. At the same time, the offer of other sports was expanded extensively, including the acquisition of the rights to the Hansgrohe Superb and World Cup field racing, which were featured on FOUR and Sporza. These competitions are sent free for all Telenet customers, but it also lost several football competitions to the new group of Eleven Sports Network. As of December 5, 2015 The offer was eventually expanded with the new channels Eleven Sports 1 and Eleven Sports 2, which have the rights of Spanish, Italian and French football competitions, NBA, NFL and ATP tennis. These channels are also included in the paying sports subscriptions of major Proximus competitor. From the football season 2016-2017, Play Sports made the full transition to HD for its 8 multisport channels. The golf channel is also broadcast in HD. Play Sports is the first sport package that makes the full transition to HD.

Since 2020-2021, Eleven Sports got the Belgian rights of Belgian football, so Play Sports 6, 7 and 8 were replaced by Eleven Pro League 1, 2 and 3 in August 2020.

Channels 
 Play Sports 1 (HD)
 Play Sports 2 (HDMI)
 Play Sports 3 (HD)
 Play Sports 4 (HD) 
 Play Sports 5 (HD)
 Eleven Pro League 1* (HD)
 Eleven Pro League 2* (HD)
 Eleven Pro League 3* (HD)
 Play Sports GOLF (HD)
 Eleven Sports 1* (HD)
 Eleven Sports 2* (HD)
 Extreme Sports*
 * = Extra channel in the package that is not owned by Telenet itself.

For French viewers, the Be Sport package is available, with the VOOsport option for the Belgian football.

Programs 
 Weekend Round-Up
 Play Sports Classic
 Saturday Round-up
 Hoogvliegers
 Studio Live
 Fanatico
 Premier League Monday
 Voetbalcarrousel
 Kick off

Overview offer

Football 
 Jupiler Pro League (Belgium)
 Crocky Cup /  Cup of Belgium
 Premier League, FA Cup, The Championship (England)
 Bundesliga, DFB Pokal (Germany)
 Serie A (Italy)
 Eredivisie (The Netherlands)
 Ligue 1 (France)
 Premier League, Challenge Cup, League Cup (Scotland)
 Série A (Brasil)
 La Liga, The final of the Copa del Rey (Spain)
 European League
 Qualification matches EK / WC

Motorsport 
 Formula 1
 Formula E
 MXGP
 WRC
 Motorcross der Nation

Golf 
 European tour
 American tour
 4 majors
 Ryder Cup

Basketball 
 Scooore League
 European Championship
 Euroleague
 NBA

Field Racing 
 Hansgrohe Superprestige Cyclocross (8 matches)
 UCI World Cup Cyclocross (9 matches)
 Select Other Cyclocross (7 matches)

Tennis 
 ATP World Tour Masters 1000 (10  Tournaments)
 ATP World Tour 250
 ATP Finals

Cycling 
 Tour de Suisse
 Tour des Fjords

Volley-ball 
 Belgium competition
 Italian competition

Hockey 
 Belgium competition
 European Championship

Handball 
 EHF Champions League
 Bundesliga

American football 
 NFL

References

Television channels in Flanders